George Clarke Jenkins (November 19, 1908 – April 6, 2007) was an American production designer.

Born in Baltimore, Maryland, he studied architecture at University of Pennsylvania before leaving to build sets. He did the settings and lighting for Rumple in 1957. One Tony nomination was for his set for the 1959 Broadway drama The Miracle Worker. He also designed the sets for the 1968 play The Only Game in Town.

He shared his Academy Award with George Gaines for the 1976 film All the President's Men. He later taught at University of California, Los Angeles. Jenkins died at his home in Santa Monica, California.

References

External links

George Jenkins papers and designs, 1933-1981, held by the Billy Rose Theatre Division, New York Public Library for the Performing Arts
George Jenkins papers, Margaret Herrick Library, Academy of Motion Picture Arts and Sciences

1908 births
2007 deaths
Best Art Direction Academy Award winners
American production designers
Broadway set designers
Donaldson Award winners
University of Pennsylvania School of Design  alumni
Artists from Baltimore